Pudan may refer to:
Dick Pudan (1881–1957), British footballer
Pudan, Iran, a village in Hormozgan Province, Iran